Saints Maurus, Pantelemon and Sergius (died 117 AD) are 2nd century Christian martyrs venerated at Bisceglie on the Adriatic. Tradition holds that Maurus was from Bethlehem and was sent to be the first bishop of Bisceglie by Saint Peter. They were killed during the persecutions of Christians under the Roman emperor Trajan.

Notes

117 deaths
Italian saints
2nd-century Christian martyrs
Year of birth unknown
Groups of Christian martyrs of the Roman era